Wayne Douglas Maxner (born September 27, 1942 in Halifax, Nova Scotia) is a Canadian former hockey player for the Boston Bruins of the National Hockey League (NHL).

He led the Ontario Hockey Association junior A league in scoring in 1962–63 as a member of the Niagara Falls Flyers and won the Eddie Powers Memorial Trophy as league MVP. He played 54 games for the Bruins in 1964–65, and eight more the following season.  He bounced around the American, Western and Eastern Hockey Leagues until retiring in 1973.  In 62 NHL games, Maxner scored eight goals and nine assists.  His first NHL goal occurred on December 5, 1964 in Boston's 3-3 tie versus the New York Rangers at Boston Garden.  He recorded 48 penalties in minutes.

Following his retirement as a player, Maxner served as the head coach of several teams, primarily the Windsor Spitfires and London Knights of the Ontario Hockey League.  He briefly coached the Detroit Red Wings for parts of two seasons between 1980 and 1982, finishing with an NHL record of 129 games coached and a 34–68–27 record.

Career statistics

Regular season and playoffs

NHL coaching record

References

1942 births
Living people
Barrie Flyers players
Boston Bruins players
Detroit Red Wings coaches
Hull Festivals coaches
Ice hockey people from Nova Scotia
London Knights coaches
Sportspeople from Halifax, Nova Scotia
Sudbury Wolves coaches
Windsor Spitfires coaches
Canadian ice hockey left wingers
Canadian ice hockey coaches